CPK may refer to:

Businesses and organizations
California Pizza Kitchen, a restaurant chain
Chesapeake Utilities (New York Stock Exchange symbol CPK)
Communist Party of Kampuchea, commonly known as the Khmer Rouge
Communist Party of Korea, a former political party in Korea
Communist Party of Kenya, a Kenyan political party

Science and technology
Process capability index (Cpk), a measure of process capability
CPK coloring, a way to color atoms when visualizing molecular models
Creatine phosphokinase, an enzyme found in humans, or alternatively a blood test for it

Transport
Carpenders Park railway station, England (National Rail station code CPK)
New Central Polish Airport, Central Communication Transport Port in Poland (air and rail)

Other uses
"C.P.K." (Unwritten Law song)
Cabbage Patch Kids, a line of children's dolls